Deimos Imaging is a Spanish company which operates a complete Remote Sensing system.  The system comprises the satellites Deimos-1 and Deimos-2, the ground stations at Boecillo near Valladolid and Puertollano near Ciudad Real, the reception hardware hosted at KSAT, Svalbard, and Inuvik and kiruna at SSC and an image processing laboratory with generation of agricultural and environment products also at Boecillo.

Deimos-1 satellite has been operational since its launch on 29 July 2009  and the company has been commercializing imagery ever since.  The goal of the company is to provide imagery data globally at the highest quality standards. 19 June 2014, Deimos-2 was launched as well.

References

External links 
 Company web page 

Remote sensing companies
Companies based in Castile and León